Vladimir "Vlad" Kuljanin (born April 2, 1985) is a Canadian basketball player, who plays as a center. 

Kuljanin was seventh place with the Canadian national men's basketball team at the 2007 Pan American Games in Rio de Janeiro. He moved to Toronto from his birth city of Sarajevo at the age of ten. Kuljanin played in the 2005 FIBA U21 World Championship, where Canada won the bronze medal.

References
Canadian Olympic Committee

External links
UNC Wilmington Seahawks bio

1985 births
Living people
Basketball players at the 2007 Pan American Games
Bosnia and Herzegovina emigrants to Canada
Canadian expatriate basketball people in the United States
Canadian men's basketball players
Canadian people of Bosnia and Herzegovina descent
Canadian people of Serbian descent
Centers (basketball)
Naturalized citizens of Canada
Pan American Games competitors for Canada
Serbs of Bosnia and Herzegovina
Basketball players from Sarajevo
Basketball players from Toronto
UNC Wilmington Seahawks men's basketball players